The 2015–16 Tulsa Golden Hurricane men's basketball team represented the University of Tulsa during the 2015–16 NCAA Division I men's basketball season. The Golden Hurricane, led by second year head coach Frank Haith, played their home games at the Reynolds Center and were members of the American Athletic Conference. They finished the season 20–12, 12–6 in The American play to finish in a three-way tie for third place. They lost in the quarterfinals of The American Athletic tournament to Memphis. They received an at-large bid to the NCAA tournament where they lost in the First Four to Michigan

Previous season
The Golden Hurricane finished the season 23–11, 14–4 in American Athletic play to finish in second place. They advanced to the semifinals of the American Athletic tournament where they lost to UConn. They were invited to the National Invitation Tournament where they defeated William & Mary in the first round before losing in the second round to Murray State.

Departures

Incoming Transfers

Class of 2015 commitments

Class of 2016 commitments

Roster

Schedule

|-
!colspan=9 style="background:#084c9e; color:#CFB53B;"| Exhibition

|-
!colspan=9 style="background:#084c9e; color:#CFB53B;"| Non-conference regular season

|-
!colspan=9 style="background:#084c9e; color:#CFB53B;"| Conference regular season

|-
!colspan=9 style="background:#084c9e; color:#CFB53B;"| American Athletic Conference tournament

|-
!colspan=9 style="background:#084c9e; color:#CFB53B;"| NCAA tournament

References

Tulsa Golden Hurricane men's basketball seasons
Tulsa
Tulsa
2015 in sports in Oklahoma
2016 in sports in Oklahoma